The 1937 Hofstra Flying Dutchmen football team represented Hofstra University as an independent during the 1937 college football season. It was the program's first-ever season and they finished with a record of 2–4. Their head coach was Jack McDonald and their captain was Al Sorrentino.

Schedule

References

Hofstra
Hofstra Pride football seasons
Hofstra Flying Dutchmen football